Jerry Marc Deets (November 1, 1947 - March 14, 2002) was a Paralympian athlete from the United States competing mainly in category F53 pentathlon and field events.

He competed in the 1996 Summer Paralympics in Atlanta, United States. There he won a bronze medal in the men's pentathlon P53-57 event, a bronze medal in the men's shot put F53 event and finished fourth in the men's javelin throw F53 event. All this accomplished at 47 years of age. He participated in many international events in track and field as well as wheelchair road racing. He was inducted to Adaptive Sports Hall of Fame in 1999 following his success in wheelchair athletics.

Deets died at the age of 54 in Santa Cruz in 2002.

References

1947 births
2002 deaths
Sportspeople from Denver
Sportspeople from Santa Cruz, California
Paralympic track and field athletes of the United States
Athletes (track and field) at the 1996 Summer Paralympics
Paralympic bronze medalists for the United States
American male shot putters
American pentathletes
Living people
Medalists at the 1996 Summer Paralympics
Paralympic medalists in athletics (track and field)
Wheelchair shot putters
Paralympic shot putters